A homunculus is either an artificial man created through alchemy, or, in contemporean science, a representation of a human or small creature used to illustrate the functioning of a system.

Homunculus may also refer to:

Science 

 Homunculus, a genus of prehistoric New World monkeys
 Homunculus Nebula, a part of the Eta Carinae Nebula
 Cortical homunculus, also known as the Penfield homunculus, a physical representation of the primary motor cortex of the rest of the body
 Fetiform teratoma, a rare cyst having a fetal structure
 The homunculus argument is a fallacy arising most commonly in the theory of vision

Fiction 

 Homunculus (novel) 1986 comic science fiction novel by James Blaylock
The Homunculus, 1949 novel by David H. Keller
Homunculus (manga), 2003 manga by Hideo Yamamoto
The Homunculi, group of powerful and generally malevolent characters from the anime and manga Fullmetal Alchemist
 Homunculus (film), 6-chapter German sci-fi serial shown theatrically in Germany in 1916

Music 
 "Homonculus", a song from Xiu Xiu's debut album Knife Play